Timothy Michael Lenton  (born July 1973) is Professor of Climate Change and Earth System Science at the University of Exeter. In April 2013 he was awarded the Royal Society Wolfson Research Merit Award. He graduated with a first-class degree in natural sciences from Robinson College, Cambridge in 1994 and completed his PhD under Andrew Watson at the University of East Anglia in 1998.

Gaia Hypothesis
Lenton has taken an interest in the Gaia Hypothesis for much of his career. Early in his career, in the journal Nature, Lenton addressed a concern that the Gaia Hypothesis was incompatible with the theory of natural selection by demonstrating that a model based on Daisyworld was strengthened by incorporating natural selection. Lenton, with Andy Watson, co-authored the book Revolutions that Made the Earth; it expands on the ideas of James Lovelock on the Gaia Hypothesis, by highlighting mechanisms by which the Earth system has been stabilised by negative feedbacks throughout Earth history.

Publications

References

1973 births
Living people
Alumni of Robinson College, Cambridge
Alumni of the University of East Anglia
Academics of the University of East Anglia
Fellows of the Geological Society of London
Fellows of the Linnean Society of London
Fellows of the Royal Society of Biology
Royal Society Wolfson Research Merit Award holders